Legacy is an original novel written by Gary Russell and based on the long-running British science fiction television series Doctor Who. It features the Seventh Doctor, Ace, Bernice, the Ice Warriors and Alpha Centauri and a return for the Doctor to Peladon. A prelude to the novel, also penned by Russell, appeared in Doctor Who Magazine #211. All chapters in the novel are titled after Gary Numan songs.

Reception 
In 1994, Science Fiction Chronicles Don D'Ammassa reviewed the novel as "Okay, these aren't great art, but for all its simple mindedness, I have a lot more fun in this universe than in the one created by Star Trek."

References

External links
Legacy Prelude

1994 British novels
1994 science fiction novels
Legacy (Doctor Who)|Legacy
Novels by Gary Russell
Seventh Doctor novels